was the sixth shōgun of the Kamakura shogunate of Japan who reigned from 1252 to 1266.

He was the first son of the Emperor Go-Saga and replaced the deposed Fujiwara no Yoritsugu as shōgun at the age of ten. He was a puppet ruler controlled by the Hōjō clan regents.

 10 May 1252 (Kenchō 4, 1st day of the 4th month): Hōjō Tokiyori and Hōjō Shigetoki sent a representative to Kyoto to accompany Munetaka to Kamakura where he would be installed as shogun.
 22 August 1266 (Bun'ei 3, 20th day of the 7th month): Munetaka was deposed, and his son Koreyasu was installed as the 7th shōgun at the age of two.

The deposed shōgun became a Buddhist monk in 1272. His priestly name was Gyōshō. He was a writer of Waka poetry.

Family
Parents
 Father: Emperor Go-Saga (後嵯峨天皇, Go-Saga-tennō, April 1, 1220 – March 17, 1272) 
 Mother: Taira no Muneko (d. 1302), Taira no Munemoto's daughterConsorts and issues: 

 Wife: Konoe Saiko (近衛 宰子, b. 1241), daughter of Konoe Kanetsune (近衛 兼経)
Prince Koreyasu (惟康親王,  26 May 1264 – 25 November 1326), first son
Princess Rinshi (掄子女王, b. 1265), Consort of  Emperor Go-Uda, first daughter
 Concubine: Horikawa no Tsubone, daughter  of Horikawa Tomomori (堀川具教)
Prince Hayata (早田宮真覚), second son
Princess Mizuko (瑞子女王) later Eikamon'in (永嘉門院; 1272–1329), Consort of Emperor Go-Uda, second daughter

Eras of Munetaka's bakufu 
The years in which Munetaka was shogun are more specifically identified by more than one era name or nengō.
 Kenchō (1249–1257)
 Kōgen (1256–1257)
 Shōka (1257–1259)
 Shōgen (1259–1260)
 Bun'ō (1260–1261)
 Kōchō (1261–1264)
 Bun'ei (1264–1275)

Notes

References
 Nussbaum, Louis-Frédéric and Käthe Roth. (2005).  Japan encyclopedia. Cambridge: Harvard University Press. ;  OCLC 58053128
 Titsingh, Isaac. (1834). Nihon Ōdai Ichiran; ou,  Annales des empereurs du Japon. Paris: Royal Asiatic Society, Oriental Translation Fund of Great Britain and Ireland. OCLC 5850691.

1242 births
1274 deaths
13th-century Japanese poets
13th-century shōguns
Japanese princes
Kamakura shōguns
Kamakura period Buddhist clergy
People of Kamakura-period Japan
13th-century Japanese calligraphers
Japanese Buddhist monarchs
Sons of emperors
People from Kyoto